Jesús Galdeano (6 January 1932 – 6 May 2017) was a Spanish professional racing cyclist. He rode in three editions of the Tour de France.

Major results

1952
 1st GP Llodio
1955
 1st Stage 4 Vuelta a España
 1st Campeonato Vasco Navarro de Montaña
 6th Overall Vuelta a Andalucía
1st Stages 3 & 4
1956
 2nd Overall Euskal Bizikleta
1st Stage 6
1957
 1st Stage 5 Vuelta a Levante
 3rd Overall Vuelta a Andalucía
 3rd Trofeo Jaumendreu
 5th Trofeo Masferrer
1958
 2nd GP Pascuas
1959
 3rd National Road Race Championships
 3rd Prueba Villafranca de Ordizia
 10th Overall Vuelta a España
1960
 1st Stage 12 Vuelta a España
 2nd Prueba Villafranca de Ordizia
 3rd Overall Vuelta a Levante
1961
 1st Stage 5 Vuelta a España

References

External links
 

1932 births
2017 deaths
Spanish male cyclists
Cyclists from Navarre
People from Estella Oriental